Ren Keyu (born October 18, 2006), is a junior high school student from Leshan, Sichuan, China who is known for being the tallest male teenager as of 2020 with a height of 221.03 cm (7 ft 3.02 in). His nickname is Xiaoyu. He applied to Guinness World Records in August 2020 for being considered as the tallest male teenager. On October 18, 2020, a Guinness World Records official, a doctor from The People's Hospital of Leshan, and a  reporter participated in measuring Ren or acting as witnesses. They measured him three times that day at 8am, 2pm, and 8pm. On November 18, 2020, Guinness World Records announced he was the tallest male teenager.

Owing to his being  in kindergarten, his family brought him for a medical examination. Doctors initially thought he had gigantism before realising that there was nothing abnormal with his growth hormone and pituitary gland. Basketball coaches sought him to play on their teams when he was an elementary school student but he was unable to because he has flat feet and osteochondroma and struggles with demanding exercise. By the time he was 11 years old, doctors had performed four surgeries on his feet. He enjoys reading fairy tales and science fiction. An avid participant in esports, he aims to become an esports player.

See also
 List of tallest people

References

2006 births
Living people
People from Leshan